Thiess Pty Ltd is an international mining services company based in Brisbane, Australia. Established in the 1930s as Horn & Thiess, the company later became Thiess Bros and Thiess Contractors before being bought by Leighton Holdings in 1983 to become part of the CIMIC Group. Thiess' headquarters are located in the Thiess Centre in South Bank in the Brisbane CBD near the TAFE Brisbane City campus.

Following restructuring within CIMIC in 2014 and the merger of several international Leighton businesses into Thiess, the company claims to have become the largest contract mining services provider in the world.

History
Thiess was founded as Horn & Thiess in 1933 by Henry Horn and Leslie Thiess with headquarters in Toowoomba. Initially the business focused on road-building and earth moving but subsequently expanded into dam construction, open cut mining and other forms of civil engineering. After other members of the Thiess family bought Horn out, it was renamed Thiess Bros.

In 1951 Thiess was listed on the Sydney and Brisbane stock exchanges.

After importing Toyota Land Cruisers into Australia for the Snowy Mountains Scheme in 1959, Thiess became the Toyota commercial vehicle franchisee in Australia. A 40% shareholding in Thiess Toyota was sold to Toyota Australia in 1968, with the remaining stake being sold in 1980. From 1967 until 1970, Thiess was also the distributor of White Motor Company products in Australia.

In February 1980, Thiess was taken over by CSR in a hostile takeover. In April 1981, the construction division was sold to a consortium of Hochtief (50%), Westfield Group (25%) and Leslie Thiess (25%). In July 1983 Thiess was acquired by Leighton Holdings, with Hochtief becoming the majority shareholder in Leighton Holdings.

In 1987 Thiess diversified into waste collection establishing Thiess Waste Management Services. This was sold in July 2012 to Remondis.

In 2011, the business was inducted into the Queensland Business Leaders Hall of Fame.

In 2014, the mining operations of Leighton Africa, Leighton Asia and Leighton Contractors were merged into. In 2016 Thiess's civil engineering business was merged into Leighton Contractors which was renamed CPB Contractors. Since then Thiess has been entirely focused on mining projects.

In 2021, CIMIC agreed to joint ownership (50/50) of Thiess with Elliott Advisors.

Major projects
Major projects undertaken by Thiess include:

References

External Links 

 Thiess Pty Ltd digital story and oral histories, State Library of Queensland

Auto dealerships of Australia
Companies based in Brisbane
Companies formerly listed on the Australian Securities Exchange
Construction and civil engineering companies established in 1933
Construction and civil engineering companies of Australia
Mining services companies of Australia
Waste management companies of Australia
Westfield Group
1950s initial public offerings
Australian companies established in 1933
Waste companies established in 1933
1980 mergers and acquisitions